Bidaay Byomkesh is a 2018 Indian Bengali detective thriller film written and directed by Debaloy Bhattacharya and produced by Shrikant Mohta and Mahendra Soni under the banner of Shree Venkatesh Films. The film released on 20 July 2018. It is the sixth installment of Byomkesh film series produced by SVF.

Cast
 Abir Chottopadhyay as Byomkesh Bakshi / Satyaki Bakshi (Double Role)
 Sohini Sarkar as Satyabati/ Avantika (Tunna) (Double Role)
Rahul Banerjee as Ajit Bandopadhyaya
 Joy Sengupta as Abhimanyu Bakshi, Son of Byomkesh Bakshi
 Bidipta Chakrabarty as Anasuya Bakshi, Wife of Abhimanyu Bakhshi
 Rupankar Bagchi as DC Krishnendu Malo
 Sujoy Prosad Chatterjee as Subimal Kumar Mondal
 Arindam Sil as Tunna's Father

Soundtrack

Release
The film was theatrically released on 20 July 2018.

References

External links 
 

2018 films
Bengali-language Indian films
2010s Bengali-language films
2018 crime thriller films
Indian crime thriller films
Indian detective films
Byomkesh Bakshi films
Films set in Kolkata